Covada is an unincorporated community in Ferry County, in the U.S. state of Washington.

History
A post office called Covada was established in 1905, and remained in operation until 1954. The name is an acronym of several nearby mines, namely Columbia, Orin, Verin, Ada, Dora, and Alice.

References

Unincorporated communities in Ferry County, Washington
Unincorporated communities in Washington (state)